The 13111/13112 Lal Quila Express was an Express train belonging to Indian Railways that runs between  and  in India. It was pre-independence train which ran between two important cities i.e. Delhi and Kolkata. It operates as train number 13111 from Kolkata to Delhi Junction and as train number 13112 in the reverse direction. It is named after the Red Fort which is located in Delhi. The word Lal Quila means Red Fort in Devanagari. Its last service was 1 July 2014.

Coaches
The 13111/13112 Lal Quila Express presently has two AC 3 tier, four Sleeper class and five General Unreserved coaches. As with most train services in India, coach composition may be amended at the discretion of Indian Railways depending on demand.

Service
The 13111 Lal Quila Express covers the distance of 1526 kilometres in 30 hours 55 mins (49.36 km/h) & 1552 kilometres in 34 hours 40 mins (44.77 km/h) as 13112 Lal Quila Express. As the average speed of the train is below 55 km/h, its fare does not include a Superfast surcharge.

Traction
As the entire route between Kolkata & Delhi Junction is electrified, it is hauled by a WAP-4 engine from the Howrah or Ghaziabad shed.

Timetable
13111 Lal Quila Express leaves Kolkata every day at 20:15 hrs IST and reaches Delhi Junction at 03:10 hrs IST on the 3rd day. 13112 Lal Quila Express leaves elhi Junction every day at 20:50 hrs IST and reaches Kolkata at 07:30 hrs IST on the 3rd day.

Gallery

References

External links
 http://www.indianrail.gov.in
 https://web.archive.org/web/20070303131207/http://www.irctc.co.in/
 http://www.irfca.org
 https://www.lalquilaexpress.com/

Delhi–Kolkata trains
Rail transport in Jharkhand
Rail transport in Bihar
Rail transport in Uttar Pradesh
Defunct trains in India